The Zavora pipefish (Halicampus zavorensis) is a species of marine fish of the family Syngnathidae. It is only known from three specimens found in the Western Indian Ocean, one from Zavora, Mozambique and two from Sur, Oman. Little is known about its habitat or feeding habits, but they are expected to feed on small crustaceans similar to other pipefish. It can grow to at least  in length. This species is ovoviviparous, with males carrying eggs and giving birth to live young.

References

Further reading
IUCN Seahorse, Pipefish & Stickleback Specialist Group

Fish described in 1984
Taxa named by Charles Eric Dawson
zavorensis
Marine fish